The following is a list of beaches in the United States Virgin Islands by district/island of the United States Virgin Islands, a territory of the United States.  Beaches are on the Caribbean Sea to the south or Atlantic Ocean to the north.

Saint Croix

Saint John

Saint Thomas

There are forty major beaches in Saint Thomas.

Water Island

The following beaches are in Water Island, a sub-district of the Saint Thomas District.

See also
 List of beaches

References

External links

Map of St. Croix Beaches
St John Beaches Map
Map of Beaches in St. Thomas

Beaches
+United States Virgin Islands
Beaches of the Caribbean by dependent territory